Parvati Shallow (born September 21, 1982) is an American television personality and was the $1 million winner of the reality television series Survivor: Micronesia — Fans vs. Favorites. She had previously competed in Survivor: Cook Islands in which she placed sixth, and later was the runner-up in Survivor: Heroes vs. Villains. In 2020, she competed on the show's 40th season, Survivor: Winners at War, where she placed 15th.
She is widely considered by fans and critics to be one of the most skilled contestants ever to participate.

From July 7, 2011 to October 14, 2011, Shallow starred in CBS's Around the World for Free. From 2013 to 2014, she was the host of Survivor Live on CBS.com, a weekly web-exclusive series where she interviews the voted off castaways from Survivor and chats with other special guests such as former players.

Early life
Shallow was born on September 21, 1982, in Vero Beach, Florida. She has three siblings and her family moved to Atlanta when she was 11 years old. She attended the University of Georgia and received a Bachelor of Arts degree in journalism.

Shallow began competing in boxing in 2004. She and some fellow boxers created a non-profit organization titled "Knockouts for Girls", a charity that provides scholarships and boxing lessons for underprivileged girls.

Survivor
Shallow originally auditioned for The Amazing Race along with her friend. They did not make the final cut. CBS producers, however, remembered her from her auditions and then approached her to take part in Survivor, which she gladly accepted.

Cook Islands

Shallow originally appeared as part of the Rarotonga (Raro) tribe, which represented Caucasians, along with Adam Gentry, Jonathan Penner, Jessica "Flicka" Smith, and Candice Woodcock. Her tribe did not face any danger for the first six days as they had won immunity. At the end of the second immunity challenge, Billy Garcia of the Aitutaki (Aitu) tribe told Shallow and Woodcock that he was next to go. Woodcock replied, "We love you," and Garcia believed that Woodcock had fallen in love with him. Shallow was particularly allied with Gentry and Woodcock, who truly were romantically involved. When the four tribes were merged into two, Shallow and Gentry remained in Raro while their other tribe mates were sent to Aitu. Despite being stronger in number, the new Raro continually lost in challenges. Shallow pressed for the elimination of J.P. Calderon, whom she thought as arrogant, and he became the fourth person voted out despite his physical strength. Shallow survived her tribe's next three Tribal Councils as Calderon, Stephannie Favor, and Cristina Coria were each voted off. When the contestants were down to 12, a "Mutiny" twist was presented where anybody could change tribe affiliations, and for the first time it was accepted. Shallow's former tribe mates Penner and Woodcock decided to jump back to Raro. Raro lost the next two Immunity challenges, but Shallow remained loyal to her original Raro tribemates by eliminating Brad Virata, Rebecca Borman, and Jenny Guzon-Bae.

At the merge, despite coming with a 5–4 member advantage over Aitu, Shallow found herself in the minority as Penner betrayed his former tribe mates and joined the Aitu Four in voting out Nate Gonzalez. She became angry with Penner, and a day after his betrayal, when she cut her thumb with a machete while cutting a coconut, she said that she was imagining the coconut was Penner's head. After alliance member Woodcock was eliminated, Shallow and Gentry found themselves fighting for survival. Despite being on the outside, Shallow was able to retain her strength and win two reward challenges, one being the "loved one" challenge. This worried the Aitu Four, who were dissatisfied with how Gentry and Shallow lay around camp sleeping, while they worked and got their food. In an attempt to stay in the game, Gentry and Shallow talked to Yul Kwon about voting out Penner first in exchange for their jury votes, a plan which succeeded. On day 36, Shallow was finally voted out in a 4–2 vote when the Aitu Four saw her craftiness as more of a threat than Gentry's physical strength. As a juror, she cast her vote for eventual runner-up Ozzy Lusth.

Shallow was noted for being a flirt throughout the season. She flirted with Gonzalez to ensure his loyalty, had 'cuddle sessions' with Gentry, and sat naked in a hot tub with Kwon and Lusth during a challenge reward.

Micronesia

Shallow returned as a "Favorite" and part of the Malakal tribe. She formed a close bond with James Clement and the two formed an alliance with another couple consisting of Amanda Kimmel and Ozzy Lusth. After their tribe lost the first Immunity Challenge, they tried swinging Jonny Fairplay over to their side to gain a majority over the alliance of Yau-Man Chan, Ami Cusack, Eliza Orlins, and Jonathan Penner. However, Fairplay was voted out instead as per his wishes, since he was aching to return home to his pregnant girlfriend. Shallow then made a pact with Cirie Fields to go all the way to the Final Three with Kimmel. After losing the third Immunity Challenge, Shallow was targeted by the opposing alliance, but her own alliance (now with Fields) succeeded in voting off strategic threat Chan.

At the tribal switch, Shallow and Clement were separated from their alliance as they moved to Airai. However, she remained safe as her tribe won the remaining tribal Immunity Challenges. On day 20, she made a deal with Natalie Bolton for an alliance with Clement and Alexis Jones, plus a Final Four deal with Jones and Kimmel; Bolton accepted both deals.

At the merge, Shallow found herself in a good position as she was allied with six (Jones, Kimmel, Fields, Bolton, Lusth, Clement) of the nine people left. During the tenth Immunity Challenge, Shallow convinced Jason Siska to step down from the challenge so that she could win Immunity, which worked (under the condition that the tribe would not vote off Siska). However, her "Couples Alliance" decided to go back on their word and they targeted Siska. However, Fields saw this as an opportunity to blindside physical threat Lusth instead, and she needed Shallow's help for it to work. Shallow agreed to this and recruited her Airai female allies Bolton and Jones to the plan, and Lusth was voted off 5–4. Afterward, Shallow found herself in a failed attempt to patch things up with Clement and Kimmel (who kept her distrust to herself). The five remaining women then formed an alliance to vote off the men, starting with Siska. However, when Clement was evacuated and Erik Reichenbach won Immunity, they were forced to vote off one of their own. Kimmel was the intended target, a plan of which Shallow did not want any part. So she helped Kimmel find the Hidden Immunity Idol (which was buried under the tribal flag) and together, they voted off possible jury threat Jones.

Shallow made it all the way to the Final Three with Fields and Kimmel (as promised). However, she was heartbroken to learn that only two of them would face the jury. She was eliminated first at the Final Immunity Challenge but was chosen to be in the Final Two by Kimmel as Kimmel felt that Fields would be extremely tough to beat at the Final Tribal Council. At the Final Tribal Council, Shallow convinced the jury to vote for her because of her aggressive game play compared to her previous season. Despite being accused of being a mean person by Orlins and a backstabber by Lusth, the jury decided to award Shallow the title of Sole Survivor with a close vote of 5–3, getting votes from Orlins, Siska, Jones, Bolton, and Fields.

Heroes vs. Villains

Shallow returned to play Survivor for a third time as a part of the Villains tribe. She quickly accepted an alliance with Russell Hantz and Danielle DiLorenzo. On day 18, the Villains lost immunity, and the alliance of Shallow, Hantz, and DiLorenzo were still struggling to gain control of the game. They finally gained control when they persuaded Jerri Manthey to switch sides and vote out Hantz's rival, Rob Mariano. Because the Villains had yet to vote out a female member at that point in the game, the Heroes assumed that the Villains tribe was being run by an all-women alliance, led by Shallow. When the Villains lost immunity again on day 21, they decided to further confirm the Heroes' belief of that, by voting out Benjamin "Coach" Wade. Shallow and DiLorenzo both found the hidden immunity idol together and decided not to tell Hantz. On day 24, the Villains lost immunity again and James "J. T." Thomas Jr. gave his idol to Hantz, in hopes that he would use it to vote out Shallow. Hantz, however, showed it to Shallow, along with DiLorenzo and Manthey.

On day 25, the Heroes and Villains merged into Yin Yang and went to live at the old Heroes camp. Shallow and Hantz came up with this story that they both played their idol, negating all votes, and that in the re-vote, they eliminated Courtney Yates. The new tribe quickly alienated Shallow, making her swear to get revenge on all of the Heroes. For the immunity challenge on day 27, she and DiLorenzo were the last two remaining. Shallow decided to concede immunity, because she already had one idol. Before Tribal Council, Hantz gave her his idol, as well. She then went and talked to Kimmel, who warned that Shallow should play the idol for herself. But at Tribal Council, Shallow, not trusting Kimmel's warning,  played both idols on Sandra Diaz-Twine and Manthey, sending Thomas home in a 5–0 vote.

On day 33, Hantz won immunity, and decided to turn on his alliance. He tried to pit Shallow and DiLorenzo against each other, but failed. He then aligned with the Heroes to vote DiLorenzo out, and with some help from Manthey, DiLorenzo was voted out in a 4–3 vote. He then aligned with the Heroes again and decided to target Shallow. However, his plan was ruined when she won immunity on day 36. Shallow then won her third challenge on day 37, and they voted the last Hero, Colby Donaldson, out of the game in a 4–1 vote. After Shallow failed to win the final immunity challenge, it seemed that she would be voted out, since everyone wanted her gone. She, on the other hand, wanted to get rid of Diaz-Twine, thinking she would get a lot of votes in the end. However, the four remaining players voted out Manthey in a 3–1 vote; Hantz had believed he would get her vote to win Sole Survivor.

In the end, Shallow came in second, gaining the jury votes of fellow Villains Wade, DiLorenzo, and Manthey. She beat out Hantz, who received zero votes, but was defeated by Diaz-Twine, who got the votes of all the Heroes, plus Yates, who was in an alliance with Diaz-Twine while still in the game. By the end of Heroes vs. Villains, Shallow had played a total of 114 days on Survivor, the most at that time.

Winners at War

Shallow once again returned to compete on the show's 40th season, Survivor: Winners at War. She was a member of the Sele tribe and aligned with fellow old schoolers Boston Rob Mariano, Ethan Zohn, and Danni Boatwright. However, when Sele lost immunity on day 6, Boatwright felt betrayed by Shallow and told Mariano to target Shallow instead of one of the new school players. Mariano told Shallow this plan, and Boatwright was voted out unanimously. Shallow was able to survive a few more votes until the tribe swap. After the swap, she remained on Sele along with former Sele member Michele Fitzgerald and three former Dakal members—Yul Kwon, Nick Wilson, and Wendell Holland. After losing the second immunity challenge as new tribes, Shallow found herself in the minority along with Fitzgerald. She was unsuccessful in convincing Wilson to flip and was voted out in episode 6 in a 3-2 vote, becoming the seventh person sent to the Edge of Extinction. She bequeathed her fire tokens to Fitzgerald. Shallow's journey for this season came to an end on day 35 after failing to win the chance to re-enter the game in the second and final Edge of Extinction challenge. As a juror, she cast her vote for eventual runner-up Natalie Anderson.

With 149 days played over four seasons, Shallow had played the second-longest Survivor career, only behind Mariano's 152, both of which surpassed the previous record set by Ozzy Lusth after his participation in Survivor: Game Changers in 2017, at 128.

Reception
Shallow was one of the first five inductees into the "Survivor Hall of Fame" in the year 2010, alongside Hantz, Mariano, Diaz-Twine, and Richard Hatch. She is also one of only eight players to make it to Final Tribal Council more than once, along with Hantz, Mariano, Diaz-Twine, Kimmel, Fitzgerald, Anderson, and Tony Vlachos. Reality TV podcaster and former Survivor contestant Rob Cesternino twice conducted online polls (in 2011 and 2014) for the greatest contestant in the show's history; Shallow won both times the poll was held. She has also performed well in the awards ceremony known as the "Ozcars," from prominent Survivor fan site "Survivor Oz;" ever since the first awards in 2012, Shallow has always won the award for "Sexiest Female of All Time," and in 2013, she also won the two biggest awards of "Greatest Player of All Time" and "Best Winner."

In the official issue of CBS Watch commemorating the 15th anniversary of Survivor, Shallow was voted by viewers as the fourth greatest contestant in the history of the series (only behind Cesternino, Hantz, and Mariano), and was the highest-ranking female contestant. Also, she was the only three-time contestant in the top ten to have all three of her seasons also be ranked by viewers as among the top ten greatest seasons of all time—Cook Islands was ranked tenth, Micronesia was ranked third, and Heroes vs. Villains was ranked first. In addition, she came in second in the same magazine's poll for the most attractive female contestant, only behind Brenda Lowe of Survivor: Nicaragua and Survivor: Caramoan. Accordingly, Shallow was the only female contestant to appear in both polls, and one of only two contestants overall to appear in the "greatest players" poll and one of the "most attractive" polls, the other being Lusth, her fellow Cook Islands and Micronesia player. In 2017, Entertainment Weekly had fans of the series rank the 34 winners and Shallow came in 1st place.

In 2015, host Jeff Probst named Shallow one of his top ten favorite Survivor winners, and one of his top four favorite female winners. In 2020, before the premiere of Winners at War, Probst named Shallow the best winner ever.

Personal life
In 2009, Shallow and fellow Survivor contestant Amanda Kimmel made an appearance in the movie Into the Blue 2. Shallow hosted the third season of the webseries Around the World For Free, which began airing on July 5, 2011.

In 2014, Shallow began dating fellow Survivor alum John Fincher, who competed on Survivor: Samoa. They announced their engagement in January 2017 and married on July 16, 2017. They had a daughter in July 2018. In August 2021, Shallow filed for divorce from Fincher after four years of marriage. It was later revealed that Shallow had obtained a temporary domestic violence restraining order against Fincher.

Shallow currently resides in Los Angeles, California and is a yoga teacher.

In 2020, Shallow co-authored a children's book about the importance of mindfulness titled Om the Otter.

Filmography

Television

References

External links

Survivor After Show on CBS.com
Parvati Shallow biography for Survivor: Cook Islands at CBS.com
Parvati Shallow biography for Survivor: Micronesia at CBS.com
Parvati Shallow biography for Survivor: Heroes vs. Villains at CBS.com

1982 births
American Internet celebrities
Winners in the Survivor franchise
American women boxers
Living people
Participants in American reality television series
People from Los Angeles
People from Vero Beach, Florida
Survivor (American TV series) winners
University of Georgia alumni
21st-century American women